The Hüggel is a ridge, up to , about 5 kilometres long and 1 kilometre wide, near Hasbergen in the Lower Saxon district of Osnabrück in central Germany. It is the highest point of the Osnabrück Uplands. This Upper Carboniferous outcrop is part of the Ibbenbüren Coalfield.

Hills 
Amongst the elevations in the Hüggel and its foothills − sorted by height in metres (m) above sea level (NN) - are the:

References

External links 
 Photos of surviving galleries in the Hüggel
 Caves on the Hüggel: created by the mining industry or naturally formed?

Osnabrück (district)
Former mines in Germany
Ridges of Lower Saxony
Natural regions of the Lower Weser Uplands